Hereward, was British clipper ship that was built in Scotland in 1877. She had an iron hull, three masts and full rig.

The ship was wrecked at Maroubra, New South Wales in 1898. Parts of the wreck survive in situ. The Underwater Cultural Heritage Act 2018 automatically protects the wreck and its contents, as they are more than 75 years old.

Details
Robert Duncan and Company built Hereward at Port Glasgow, launching her on 14 August 1877.

Her first owners were John Campbell, John Potter, John Ashton and others. They registered her at London. Her United Kingdom was official number 77010 and her code letters were RBKV.

By 1896 her owners were The "Hereward" Ship Company of London, and her managers were Potter Brothers.

Stranding
In May 1898 Hereward was sailing from Surabaya in the Dutch East Indies to Newcastle, New South Wales to load a cargo of coal to take to South America. Her Master was Captain Poole Hickman Gore (1861–1920).

On 5 May a storm forced her aground at the north end of Maroubra Beach, Sydney. All 25 crew members safely got ashore, where they reached a nearby wool scouring works.

Attempted salvage

The ship was insured for £6,000. After a few months it was sold for £550 to Mahlon Clarke Cowlishaw (1844–1900), of Cowlishaw Brothers, Sydney merchants and ship-owners, who bought the wreck for salvage.

On 9 December 1898 it was attempted to refloat the Hereward. With the two tugs, Commodore and Irresistible, pulling on cables connected to the anchor , and using steam winches aboard, they got the ship into  of water. However, as the ship was nearly free, a southerly gale blew up and pushed her back onto the beach, where she was battered by high seas and broken in two.

Wreck and heritage
The wreck was slowly washed out to sea afterwards and by 1937 only a triangle dorsal fin was visible above sea level. In 1950, Randwick Council feared of the danger that the remains posed to surfers and swimmers and had the remains blasted such that by 1967 it appeared that there was nothing left of the ship.

In recent times, on various occasions, swells and sweeping currents have moved large amounts of sand on the sea floor and had exposed extensive portions of the Hereward. In March 2013 after large seas, extensive parts of her iron hull, along with mast parts were exposed more than they ever had been before. In 2013 a bronze signal cannon was recovered from the wreck and is now on display in the foyer of the Maroubra Seals Club, across the road from the beach.

Hereward Street
Hereward Street in Maroubra is named after the ship.

References

External links
 
 

1877 ships
Clippers
Full-rigged ships
Merchant ships of the United Kingdom
Sailing ships of the United Kingdom
Ships built on the River Clyde
Windjammers
1898 in Australia
Maroubra, New South Wales
Maritime incidents in 1898
Shipwrecks of the Sydney Eastern Suburbs Region